Guna Trading FC is an Ethiopian football club based in Tigray.  They are a member of the Ethiopian Football Federation national league.  Their home stadium is Tigray Stadium.

Performance in CAF competitions
CAF Cup Winners' Cup: 1 appearance
2002 – Preliminary Round

References

Football clubs in Ethiopia
Sport in Tigray Region